Ken Lo (Kenneth Houi Kang Low) (born 17 March 1959) is a Cambodian-Hong Kong actor, martial artist, and stuntman. He is known for his martial arts and stunt work as a former member of the Jackie Chan Stunt Team, most notably for his antagonistic role as John in Drunken Master II (1994).

Early life
Ken Lo was born on 17 March 1959 as Kenneth Lo Wai-Kwong in Stung Treng, Cambodia. Lo's father is Hong Kong-Chinese and his mother is a Laotian. In 1975, at age 18, Lo and his family moved from Cambodia to Udon Thani, Thailand.

Five years later, in 1980, he went to Hong Kong and worked as a tour guide. His idol was Bruce Lee which led him to practise Muay Thai and Taekwondo in Thailand. He won the freestyle fighting championships seven times, so his chance came when he made his debut in Working Class (1985).

Career
In 1986, Lo met Jackie Chan in a disco in Hong Kong, where he was head of security, and Chan hired him as his own bodyguard. Lo not only became Chan's bodyguard but also acted in many of his martial arts films. One of his best-known roles is "John", the main antagonist and right-hand man of the British ambassador in Drunken Master II (1994), in which he and Chan engaged in a protracted final fight; Lo stepped in when another stunt actor was injured. That climactic ten-minute fight sequence has become legendary and one of the most remarkably sustained examples of martial arts choreography ever filmed in Hong Kong cinema.

In 2005, Lo acted in the American action film Into the Sun (2005) with Steven Seagal, with whom he was involved in a fight scene. Lo is currently active in Hong Kong film industry.

Personal life
Lo married Hong Kong actress Lai Sok-yin (黎淑賢) and they have two sons. The couple divorced in 2006. His cousin Brian Yu has performed stunts for Mark Chao movies.

In addition to his native Cantonese, he also speaks Thai, having learned when he lived in Thailand. As such, some of his film roles have lines in Thai.

Filmography

Working Class (1985) as Kickboxer
Naughty Boys (1986) as Thug
Legacy of Rage (1986) as Michael's Thug
The Law Enforcer (1986)
Project A Part II (1987) as Brains
Royal Warriors (1987) as Insp. Rocky Lo
Chi dan qing (1988) as Police Officer
Hua xin ye mei gui (1988)
The Inspector Wears Skirts (1988) as Tiger Squad Member
Final Justice (1988) as Kong
Police Story 2 (1988) as Fireman
Bed Companions (1988) as Tang Sai-Kit
Bloody Brotherhood (1989) as Wu Chi-Ko
City Warriors (1989)
The Inspector Wears Skirts 2 (1989)
Miracles (1989)
No Compromise (1989)
Devil Hunters (1989) as Thug
The Fortune Code (1989) as Japanese Soldier
Island of Fire (1990)
Lethal Parther (1990)
Stage Door Johnny (1990)
Crystal Hunt (1991)
Armour of God II: Operation Condor (1991)The Tantana (1991)Cheetah on Fire (1992)Police Story 3: Super Cop (1992)Naked Killer (1992)Fighting Fist (1992)City Hunter' (1993)Crime Story (1993)Drunken Master II (1994)Circus Kid (1994)Thunderbolt (1995)My Father is a Hero (1995)Red Zone (1995)Police Story 4: First Strike (1996)Young and Dangerous 4 (1997)Portland Street Blues (1998)Rush Hour (1998) as Juntao's Man #1Who Am I? (1998)Gorgeous (1999)Gen-X-Cops (1999)No Problem (1999)China Strike Force (2000)2000 AD (2000)Runaway (2001)Skarbuster (2002)Muscle Heat (2002)Star Runner (2003)Shanghai Knights (2003)Around the World in 80 Days (2004)New Police Story (2005)Dragon Reloaded (2005)Into the Sun (2005)The Myth (2005)Rob-B-Hood (2006)Fatal Contact (2006)Invisible Target (2007)The Drummer  (2007)Whispers and Moans (2007)Fatal Move (2008)Run Papa Run (2008)Legendary Assassin (2008)Shinjuku Incident (2009)Little Big Soldier (2010)Bad Blood (2010)Bruce Lee, My Brother (2010)Life Without Principle (2011)Nightfall (2012) - Convict in opening fightThe Fairy Tale Killer (2012)CZ12 (2012)Ip Man: The Final Fight (2013)7 Assassins (2013)Special ID (2013)The White Storm (2013)The Four II (2013)From Vegas to Macau II (2015)Imprisoned: Survival Guide for Rich and Prodigal (2015)Who Am I 2015 (2015)SPL II: A Time For Consequences (2015)Robbery (2015)10,000 Miles (2016)Special Female Force (2016)Shock Wave (2017)Paradox (2017)OCTB (2017) (TV series)Always Be with You (2017)Agent Mr Chan (2018)Concerto of the Bully (2018)Unleashed (2019)Raging Fire'' (2021)

References

External links

1959 births
Living people
20th-century Hong Kong male actors
21st-century Hong Kong male actors
Hong Kong male film actors
Hong Kong male kickboxers
Hong Kong male taekwondo practitioners
Hong Kong Muay Thai practitioners
Hong Kong people of Laotian descent
People from Stung Treng province